(born December 17, 1984) is a Japanese pop singer, and she was a member of Japanese girl group Morning Musume from 1997 until April 18, 1999. Her only album with the group is the 1998 release First Time. She was the first ever Hello! Project member to graduate.

Overview
In 1997, Fukuda joined Morning Musume along with Yuko Nakazawa, Aya Ishiguro, Natsumi Abe, and Kaori Iida. Although she was the youngest member at that time, she was the first to graduate in April 1999. Her last single with Morning Musume was Memory Seishun no Hikari. In 2005, she was working as an assistant at her father's nightclub "Philippine" in Tokyo. On November 9, 2011, her long-awaited comeback album Double Fantasy, as a part of Peacestone, was released.

In 2017, she appeared for the first time in 18 years with other former members of Morning Musume for the recording and music video of "Ai no Tane; 20th Anniversary Version". In January 2018, she also appeared in the recording and video of "Morning Coffee; 20th Anniversary Version"; and participated in many TV and other public appearances with other former and current members of the group.

She is a mother of a little girl born February 14, 2016.

References

External links
 ASAYAN Profile
 

1984 births
Living people
Singers from Tokyo
Morning Musume members
Japanese women singers
Japanese women pop singers
Japanese child singers
Japanese idols